Downes may refer to:

 Downes Sports F.C., the former name of Hinckley Downes F.C.
 Downes v. Bidwell, a US Supreme Court case
 Downes (surname), people with the surname Downes
 USS Downes, several United States Navy ships

See also
 Downs (disambiguation)